The New Zealand black angelfish or the black scalyfin, Parma alboscapularis, is a damselfish of the family Pomacentridae, found around northeastern New Zealand to depths of a few metres, over shallow rocky reef areas. Its length is between 24 and 28 cm.

References
 
 
 Tony Ayling & Geoffrey Cox, Collins Guide to the Sea Fishes of New Zealand, (William Collins Publishers Ltd, Auckland, New Zealand 1982) 

alboscapularis
Endemic marine fish of New Zealand
Fish described in 1975